Marwencol could refer to: 

Marwencol (art installation), a WWII-themed miniature town in Kingston, New York, created by outsider artist Mark Hogancamp
Marwencol (film), a 2010 documentary film directed by Jeff Malmberg about Hogancamp and his miniature town

See also
Welcome to Marwen, a 2018 drama film directed by Robert Zemeckis, based on the experiences of Mark Hogancamp